Nurudeen Adegbola Orelesi (born 10 April 1989) is a Nigerian professional footballer who plays as a defensive midfielder for Albanian club Kamza. He is well known for his powerful and accurate long shots.

Club career

Early career
Orelesi began his career with First Bank, later joined to UD Salamanca. On 2 October 2007, he left Spain to sign with Slovenian Second League club SC Bonifika, Orelesi played his first season in the reserve team before being promoted to the senior side in July 2008, appearing in three games in his first professional season 2008–09. In September 2009, he signed than for ECO F.C. Lagos.

Dinamo Tirana
Orelesi joined Albanian champions Dinamo Tirana on 1 August 2010 for a reported fee of €25,000 from ECO Lagos FC, signing a one-year contract with the club holding the option of renewing for an additional year.

Skënderbeu Korçë
He signed for his second Albanian side, Skënderbeu Korçë on 23 June 2011 on a four-year contract.

Metalurh Zaporizhya
On 20 August 2014 Orelesi signed for Ukraine club Metalurh Zaporizhya, for a fee of €100,000 from Skënderbeu Korçë. He made his competitive debut on 14 September in the matchday 6 against Volyn, playing full-90 minutes as the team suffered a 3–0 away loss. He scored his maiden goal later on 23 November in a 2–4 home loss to Dynamo Kyiv. During the 2014–15 season, Orelesi made 19 appearances, including 18 as starter, collecting 1539 minutes, as Metalurh finished in a respectable 7th place. He also played two times in Ukrainian Cup, as the team was eliminated in round of 16 to Olimpik Donetsk.

Return to Skënderbeu Korçë
On 21 January 2016, Orelesi returned to Skënderbeu Korçë for his second spell with the Albanian champions. He was allocated the squad number 80 and during the second part of 2015–16 season he contributed with 15 league appearances, helping the club to win its six consecutive league title, his fourth personal. Skënderbeu did not play European football in the summer of 2016 due to their ban over match-fixing allegations. In league, however, Orelesi was ever-presented, making 33 appearances, including 31 as starter, collecting 2657 minutes as Skënderbeu lost the championship to Kukësi in the penultimate matchday, eventually finishing third after a 2–2 draw against Partizani Tirana in the final match. In cup, Orelesi played in four matches, as Skënderbeu lost in the final to Tirana, a match which Orelesi didn't play.

Vllaznia Shkodër
On 10 August 2017, Orelesi completed a transfer to fellow Albanian Superliga side Vllaznia Shkodër by penning one-year contract with an option of a further one for an undisclosed fee. Overall, he played 30 league matches as the team was relegated to Albanian First Division for the first time in 60 years.

Kamza
On 4 August 2018, Kamza announced to have signed Orelesi on a contract running until the end of 2018–19 season.

International career
He represented Nigeria at 2009 FIFA U-20 World Cup in Egypt.

Career statistics

Honours
Skënderbeu Korçë
 Albanian Superliga: 2011–12, 2012–13, 2013–14, 2015–16
 Albanian Supercup: 2013, 2014

References

External links
FSHF profile

1989 births
Living people
Yoruba sportspeople
Sportspeople from Lagos
Nigerian footballers
Nigeria under-20 international footballers
Association football defenders
Association football midfielders
Nigerian expatriate footballers
Expatriate footballers in Spain
Expatriate footballers in Slovenia
Expatriate footballers in Ukraine
Expatriate footballers in Albania
Ukrainian Premier League players
Kategoria Superiore players
UD Salamanca players
FK Dinamo Tirana players
KF Skënderbeu Korçë players
KF Vllaznia Shkodër players
FC Kamza players
Nigerian expatriate sportspeople in Spain
Nigerian expatriate sportspeople in Slovenia
Nigerian expatriate sportspeople in Ukraine
Nigerian expatriate sportspeople in Albania
FC Metalurh Zaporizhzhia players